Sanagia velifera is a species of cyprinid fish endemic to the Sanaga River in Cameroon.  It is the only member of its genus. It is threatened by pollution of the Sanaga River by sewage and by the construction of an oil pipeline along the course of the river.

References
 

Cyprinid fish of Africa
Endemic fauna of Cameroon
Fish described in 1926